Chionanthus, common name: fringetrees, is a genus of about 150 species of flowering plants in the family Oleaceae.

The genus has a wide distribution primarily in the tropics and subtropics, but with three species extending north into temperate regions, one (C. retusus) in eastern Asia and two (C. virginicus and C. henryae) in eastern North America. Most of the tropical species are evergreen, while the three temperate species are deciduous. Some botanists restrict Chionanthus to the deciduous, temperate species, treating the evergreen species in a separate genus Linociera, but apart from leaf persistence, there is no other consistent difference between them.

They are shrubs and small to medium-sized trees growing to 3–25 m tall. The leaves are opposite, simple. The flowers are produced in feathery panicles, with a corolla subdivided into four slender lobes; they are white, pale yellow, or tinged pink. The fruit is a drupe containing a single seed.

Species
The following species are accepted by

 Chionanthus acunae (Borhidi & O.Muñiz) Borhidi - Cuba
 Chionanthus adamsii Stearn - Jamaica
 Chionanthus africanus (Knobl.) Stearn - tropical Africa
 Chionanthus albidiflorus  – Sri Lanka
 Chionanthus amblirrhinus P.S.Green - Thailand
 Chionanthus avilensis (Steyerm.) P.S.Green - Venezuela
 Chionanthus axillaris  – Australia (Queensland)
 Chionanthus axilliflorus  – Caribbean
 Chionanthus ayresii A.J.Scott - Mauritius
 Chionanthus bakeri (Urb.) Stearn - Cuba
 Chionanthus balgooyana  – Sarawak
 Chionanthus battiscombei (Hutch.) Stearn - eastern + southern Africa
 Chionanthus beccarii (Stapf) Kiew - Sumatra
 Chionanthus boutonii A.J.Scott - Mauritius
 Chionanthus brachystachys (Schltr.) P.S.Green - New Caledonia
 Chionanthus brachythyrsus  – Southern China (Hainan), Vietnam
 Chionanthus brassii (Kobuski) Kiew - Papua New Guinea
 Chionanthus broomeanus (Horne ex Oliv.) A.J.Scott – Réunion + Mauritius
 Chionanthus bumelioides (Griseb.) Stearn - Bahamas, Cuba, Hispaniola
 Chionanthus calcicola (Kerr) Kiew - Malaysia + Thailand
 Chionanthus callophylloides  – Sarawak + Sabah
 Chionanthus callophyllus  – Thailand, Malaysia, Sumatra, Borneo
 Chionanthus camptoneurus (Gilg & G.Schellenb.) Stearn - Cameroon + Gabon
 Chionanthus caudifolius (Ridl.) Kiew - Peninsular Malaysia
 Chionanthus caymanensis Stearn - Cayman Islands
 Chionanthus celebicus Koord - Sulawesi
 Chionanthus clementis (Quisumb. & Merr.) Kiew - Philippines
 Chionanthus colonchensis Cornejo & Bonifaz - Ecuador
 Chionanthus compactus  – Caribbean
 Chionanthus cordifolius Labat, Marc Pignal & O.Pascal - Comoros
 Chionanthus cordulatus  – Indonesia, Malaysia, Philippines
 Chionanthus coriaceus (S.Vidal) Yuen P.Yang & S.Y.Lu - Taiwan + Philippines
 Chionanthus crassifolius (Mart.) P.S.Green - Brazil
 Chionanthus crispus  – Sabah
 Chionanthus curvicarpus  – Indonesia, Malaysia, Philippines
 Chionanthus cuspidatus Blume - Borneo
 Chionanthus decipiens P.S.Green - Myanmar + Thailand
 Chionanthus densiflorus Zoll. & Moritzi -  Java
 Chionanthus dictyophyllus (Urb.) Stearn - Hispaniola
 Chionanthus diversifolius Miq - Sumatra
 Chionanthus domingensis  – Caribbean
 Chionanthus dussii (Krug & Urb.) Stearn - Dominica + Martinique
 Chionanthus ellipticus Blume - Java + Sumatra
 Chionanthus enerve (Steenis) Kiew - Borneo
 Chionanthus eriorachis (Kerr) P.S.Green - Thailand
 Chionanthus evenius  – Malesia
 Chionanthus ferrugineus (Gilg) P.S.Green - Brazil
 Chionanthus filiformis (Vell.) P.S.Green - Brazil
 Chionanthus fluminensis (Miers) P.S.Green - Brazil
 Chionanthus foveolatus  (Pock ironwood) – Southern Africa
 Chionanthus gigantifolius Koord - Sulawesi
 Chionanthus gigas (Lingelsh.) Kiew - New Guinea
 Chionanthus globosus  – Borneo
 Chionanthus glomeratus Blume - Sumatra
 Chionanthus grandifolius (Elmer) Kiew - Philippines
 Chionanthus greenii Lombardi - Brazil
 Chionanthus guangxiensis  – Southeastern China (Guangxi).
 Chionanthus guianensis (Aubl.) Pers - Venezuela + French Guiana
 Chionanthus hahlii (Rech.) Kiew - Bismarck, Solomons,  Samoa
 Chionanthus hainanensis  – Southern China (Hainan)
 Chionanthus havilandii  – Borneo
 Chionanthus henryae H.L.Li - USA (Florida, Alabama, Georgia, Arkansas)
 Chionanthus henryanus  – Southwestern China, Burma
 Chionanthus holdridgei  – Caribbean
 Chionanthus implicatus (Rusby) P.S.Green - South America
 Chionanthus intermedius  – India
 Chionanthus insularis Labat - Comoros
 Chionanthus jamaicensis (Urb.) Stearn - Jamaica
 Chionanthus kinabaluensis  – Borneo
 Chionanthus kajewskii (Sleumer) Kiew - Solomon Islands
 Chionanthus lancifolius (Ridl.) Kiew - Peninsular Malaysia
 Chionanthus leopoldii  – Borneo
 Chionanthus ligustrinus  – Caribbean
 Chionanthus littoreus Miq - Sumatra
 Chionanthus longiflorus  – Southwestern China (Yunnan)
 Chionanthus longipetalus (Merr.) Kiew - Sabah, Sarawak
 Chionanthus lucens  – Sabah
 Chionanthus luzonicus Blume - Philippines
 Chionanthus macrobotrys (Merr.) Kiew -  Sabah, Sarawak
 Chionanthus macrocarpus  – Indonesia, Malaysia
 Chionanthus macrothyrsus (Merr.) Soejarto & P.K.Lôc - Vietnam
 Chionanthus mala-elengi (Dennst.) P.S.Green - India, Bangladesh, Nepal, Bhutan, Thailand, Vietnam, Laos, Burma, Cambodia, Peninsular Malaysia, Andaman Islands
 Chionanthus mannii (Soler.) Stearn - western + central Africa
 Chionanthus maxwellii P.S.Green - Thailand
 Chionanthus micranthus (Mart.) Lozano & Fuertes - Brazil
 Chionanthus microbotrys (Kerr) P.S.Green - Cambodia, Laos, Thailand, Vietnam
 Chionanthus microstigma (Gagnep.) P.S.Green - Laos, Thailand, Vietnam
 Chionanthus mildbraedii (Gilg & G.Schellenb.) Stearn - central Africa
 Chionanthus minutiflorus Kurz - Burma
 Chionanthus montanus Blume - Java, Sulawesi, Andaman & Nicobar Islands
 Chionanthus niloticus (Oliv.) Stearn - tropical Africa
 Chionanthus nitens Koord. & Valeton - Java, Sulawesi
 Chionanthus nitidus (Merr.) Kiew - Philippines
 Chionanthus oblanceolatus (B.L.Rob.) P.S.Green - Mexico + Central America
 Chionanthus oblongifolius Koord. & Valeton - Java
 Chionanthus obtusifolius (Lam.) Stearn - Madagascar
 Chionanthus oliganthus (Merr.) Kiew - Sabah, Sarawak
 Chionanthus pachyphyllus  – Borneo
 Chionanthus palustris  – Borneo
 Chionanthus panamensis (Standl.) Stearn - Mexico, Central America
 Chionanthus parkinsonii (Hutch.) Bennet & Raizada - Thailand, Vietnam, Andaman & Nicobar Islands
 Chionanthus pedunculatus P.S.Green - New Caledonia
 Chionanthus peglerae (C.H.Wright) Stearn - South Africa (Natal + Cape Province)
 Chionanthus picrophloia  – Australia (Queensland)
 Chionanthus plurifloroides  – Borneo
 Chionanthus pluriflorus  – Borneo
 Chionanthus polycephalus  – Borneo
 Chionanthus polygamus  – Indonesia, Malaysia, New Guinea
 Chionanthus porcatus  – Borneo
 Chionanthus proctorii Stearn - Jamaica
 Chionanthus pubescens  – Ecuador, Peru
 Chionanthus pubicalyx  – Borneo
 Chionanthus purpureus Lam. - Sri Lanka
 Chionanthus pygmaeus  (Pygmy fringetree) – Southeastern United States (Florida)
 Chionanthus quadristamineus  – Australia (Lord Howe Island endemic)
 Chionanthus ramiflorus  – Australia (Queensland), southern China, India, Nepal, Vietnam
 Chionanthus remotinervius (Merr.) Kiew - Philippines
 Chionanthus retusus  (Chinese fringetree) – China, Japan, Korea
 Chionanthus richardsiae Stearn - Zambia
 Chionanthus riparius (Lingelsh.) Kiew - New Guinea
 Chionanthus rostratus (Teijsm. & Binn.) Miq. - Java
 Chionanthus rugosus  – Borneo
 Chionanthus rupicola (Lingelsh.) Kiew - Indonesia, New Guinea
 Chionanthus sabahensis  – Sabah
 Chionanthus salicifolius (Lingelsh.) Kiew - New Guinea
 Chionanthus sessiliflorus (Hemsl.) Kiew - New Guinea + Solomon Islands
 Chionanthus sleumeri  – Australia (Queensland)
 Chionanthus spicatus  – Borneo
 Chionanthus spiciferus (Ridl.) Kiew - Peninsular Malaysia
 Chionanthus stenurus (Merr.) Kiew - Sulawesi
 Chionanthus subsessilis (Eichler) P.S.Green - Brazil
 Chionanthus sumatranus Blume - Sumatra + Andaman Islands
 Chionanthus sutepensis (Kerr) P.S.Green - Thailand
 Chionanthus tenuis P.S.Green - Brazil
 Chionanthus thorelii (Gagnep.) P.S.Green - Cambodia, Laos, Thailand, Vietnam
 Chionanthus timorensis Blume - Timor
 Chionanthus trichotomus (Vell.) P.S.Green - Brazil, Argentina, Paraguay
 Chionanthus tropophyllus (H.Perrier) Stearn - Madagascar
 Chionanthus urbanii (Knobl.) Stearn - Hispaniola
 Chionanthus velutinus (Kerr) P.S.Green - Thailand
 Chionanthus verruculatus D.Fang - China (Guangxi)
 Chionanthus verticillatus (Gagnep.) Soejarto & P.K.Lôc - Vietnam
 Chionanthus virginicus  (White fringetree) – Eastern United States (Texas to Florida to Massachusetts to Missouri)
 Chionanthus vitiensis (Seem.) A.C.Sm. - Niue, Fiji, Samoa, Tonga
 Chionanthus wurdackii B.Ståhl - Peru
 Chionanthus zeylanicus L. - Sri Lanka, southern India
 Chionanthus zollingerianus Koord. & Valeton - Java

References

Cited works

External links 
University of Pretoria: Chionanthus foveolatus

 
Oleaceae genera
Ornamental trees